Daens  is a 1992 Belgian period drama film directed by Stijn Coninx, after a novel by Louis Paul Boon. This 1992 drama starring Jan Decleir, Gérard Desarthe, Antje de Boeck and Michael Pas, tells the true story of Adolf Daens, a Catholic priest in Aalst who strives to improve the miserable working conditions in the local factories. It was nominated for an Academy Award for Best Foreign Language Film in 1992.

In 2008 the film's screenplay was adapted into a stage musical.

Plot
It's 1890. Priest Adolf Daens returns to his hometown, the Belgian municipality Aalst, after a dispute with bishop Antoon Stillemans. Daens moves in with his brother Pieter, publisher of the local newspaper "Land Van Aelst".

Daens is upset when he hears about the bad work conditions in the textile industry. Workmen are abused and exploited by the rich directors only for their own profit. To gain more profit, the companies have just decided to fire all men. They are replaced by women as their wages are much lower. Children need to work day and night, fall asleep and are flattened under the mechanical looms. Industrial accidents happen continuously and the management takes no action.

A new catastrophe will soon happen: Stephane Borremans is about to fire 50% of his employees. His action is supported by Charles Woeste, a foreman of the Catholic-Party fraction in the Chamber of Representatives. Daens resists and wants to stop the atrocity. Pieter helps him in his task by publishing the misbehaviours in the textile industry in his newspaper. Daens becomes a pulpit and, later on, also a member of the Chamber of Representatives.

Nette Scholliers is the eldest daughter of a Catholic family. She is just 17. As her parents have been made redundant, she is the only one who is earning some money to support her whole family. As soon as she hears about Daens's plans, she supports him. Daens is even supported by the liberal party and the socialist party. Jan, a socialist, falls in love with Nette and both start a forbidden romance.

Daens starts to doubt whether he can really change the bad circumstances. Furthermore, as he chooses the side of the poor people, he gets into a conflict with the rich directors, the Catholic party and even the Catholic church. Father Daens is a thorn in their side as he has become a symbol in the hardline freedom struggle of the workmen.

Woeste sets up a plot in which he even involves the Holy See. Daens is summoned by Pope Leo XIII and is put before a dilemma: either he stays a priest or he becomes a politician. Daens just neglects the warnings and continues both of his activities. This leads to his compulsory defrocking.

Eventually, Daens convinces the Belgian politicians that work conditions must improve and workmen must have more rights. Thanks to this action, the directors are forced to invest in better work conditions and to assume a greater responsibility in the prevention of accidents.

Cast 
 Jan Decleir – Adolf Daens
 Gérard Desarthe – Charles Woeste
 Antje de Boeck – Nette Scholliers
 Michael Pas – Jan De Meeter
 Karel Baetens – Jefke
 Julien Schoenaerts – Bishop Stillemans
 Wim Meuwissen – Pieter Daens
 Brit Alen – Louise Daens
 Johan Leysen – Schmitt
 Idwig Stéphane – Eugene Borremans
 Jappe Claes – Ponnet
 Frank Vercruyssen – Louis Scholliers
 Matthias Schoenaerts – Wannes Scholliers
 Bart Geyskens – schoolboy

Awards and nominations

See also 
 List of submissions to the 65th Academy Awards for Best Foreign Language Film
 List of Belgian submissions for the Academy Award for Best Foreign Language Film

References

External links 
 

Films directed by Stijn Coninx
1993 films
1990s Dutch-language films
1990s French-language films
Latin-language films
1990s historical drama films
Belgian historical drama films
Belgian biographical drama films
Films set in Belgium
Films set in the 1890s
Films set in the 1900s
Films set in the Victorian era
Films based on Belgian novels
Films shot in Brussels
Films shot in Ghent
1990s biographical drama films
Films adapted into plays
Cultural depictions of Belgian men
Cultural depictions of religious leaders
Cultural depictions of activists
Cultural depictions of politicians
Works about the Industrial Revolution
1992 drama films
1992 films
1993 drama films